Shapoor Gharib (Persian: شاپور قریب, also spelled: Shapour Gharib or Qarib; 1933 – 5 June 2012) was an Iranian director and screenplay writer.

Filmography
Notorious 1972
The Rooster 1974
Mammal, The American 1976
Holidays 1978
Let Me Live 1986
The Shadows of Sorrow 1988
The Return of a Hero 1991
Our Little Family 1992
Tears and Smiles 1996
Youthful Days 1999-2000
The Sear 2009
The Last Station (Episode: "The Visit") 2011

References

External links
 
 
 

1933 births
2012 deaths
Iranian screenwriters
Iranian film directors
People from Semnan, Iran
Iranian television directors
Iranian male short story writers
Burials at artist's block of Behesht-e Zahra